Cleveland Pittsburgh Crosby (born April 3, 1956) is a former American football defensive end in the National Football League. He was drafted by the Cleveland Browns in the 2nd round of the 1980 NFL Draft. He started his college football career at Purdue before transferring and finishing his career at Arizona.

References

1956 births
Living people
Baltimore Colts players